Club Row may refer to:

Park West (Miami)
Part of 27th Street (Manhattan), in New York City
a street in Bethnal Green, London, site of a former animal market until 1983